Duas Mulheres is a 2009 Portuguese drama film directed by João Mário Grilo.

Cast
Beatriz Batarda as Joana
Débora Monteiro
Virgílio Castelo

Reception
Beatriz Batarda was nominated for Best Actress at the 2011 Globos de Ouro.

In Público's Ípsilon, Jorge Mourinha gave the film two out of five stars and Mário Jorge Torres gave it three out of five.

References

External links

2009 drama films
2009 films
Films directed by João Mário Grilo
Lesbian-related films
Portuguese drama films
Portuguese LGBT-related films
LGBT-related drama films

2009 LGBT-related films